The 2000–01 Scottish Challenge Cup was the tenth season of the competition, which was also known as the Bell's Challenge Cup for sponsorship reasons. It was competed for by the 30 member clubs of the Scottish Football League. The defending champions were Alloa Athletic, who defeated Inverness Caledonian Thistle 5–4 on penalties in the 1999 final.

The final was played on 19 November 2000, between Airdrieonians and Livingston at Broadwood Stadium in Cumbernauld. Airdrieonians won 3–2 on penalties after a 2–2 draw after extra time, to win the tournament for the second time after winning it in 1994.

Schedule

First round 
Hamilton Academical and Stenhousemuir received random byes into the second round.

Source: Soccerbase

Second round 

Source: Soccerbase

Quarter-finals

Semi-finals

Final

References

External links 
 Scottish Football League Scottish Challenge Cup on Scottish Football League website
 ESPN Soccernet  Scottish League Challenge Cup homepage on ESPN Soccernet
 BBC Sport – Scottish Cups Challenge Cup on BBC Sport

Scottish Challenge Cup seasons
Challenge Cup
Scottish Challenge Cup